Erigeron uncialis is a North American species of flowering plant in the family Asteraceae known by the common name lone fleabane or limestone daisy. It is native to the western United States, in the states of Nevada and California.

Erigeron uncialis grows on cliff faces, usually limestone, often alongside various conifer trees. It is a clump-forming perennial herb rarely more than 7 centimeters (2.8 inches) tall, producing a taproot and a woody underground caudex. The inflorescence is made up of only one flower heads per stem. Each head contains 22–30 white or pink ray florets surrounding numerous yellow disc florets.

Varieties
Erigeron uncialis var. conjugans S.F.Blake - Nevada
Erigeron uncialis var. uncialis - California

References

uncialis
Flora of Nevada
Flora of California
Plants described in 1934
Flora without expected TNC conservation status